The End Records is a record label in Manhattan that specializes in rock, heavy metal, indie, and electronic music.

Early years (1998–2005)
The End Records was founded by Andreas Katsambas in Pasadena, California, with the goal of helping small underground artists. Within three years it became a full-time job and Katsambas moved the office to Salt Lake City in 2002. Too underground to get a national distribution deal, he started his own webstore, selling each release for $10 including shipping; the mail order (The Omega Order) helped cover basic expenses and slowly started bringing in other titles.

The next three years were critical in expanding the label which began signing bands such as The Gathering, Crisis, Arcturus, Ulver and many more.

National distribution, moving to Brooklyn (2005–2006)
In 2005 after meeting with most of the major distribution companies, The End signed a national distribution deal with Red Music and moved to Brooklyn, NY, the following year.

The move to New York enabled the label to expand and diversify their building roster (Dissection, Moonfog, Voivod feat. Jason Newsted of Metallica) with artists such as Mindless Self Indulgence, Danzig, Lemonheads, Juliette Lewis, Badly Drawn Boy, Brendan Perry, Art Brut, The Prodigy, Anathema, Dir En Grey, and Anvil, to name a few. While the label grew, Andreas commitment to each band didn't change; he felt each one was a top priority and has maintained that philosophy ever since.

Growth (2007–2009)
In 2007 The End was featured in Fortune Small Business and CNN which won Fortune their sole New York Press Club award for entertainment news in the magazine category. Now on the rise and gaining attention from press, 2008 won them the CMJ Indie Label of the year award. That same year, they celebrated Mindless Self Indulgence's entrance into the Billboard Top 30 Charts, the highest entry for the band, who also placed three Top 5 singles in the digital charts in the same week. After winning the Eurovision contest with 120,000,000 votes, Finnish metal band Lordi joined the roster, shortly thereafter The Answer came on board, who were hand-picked by AC/DC to support them on their 2008 worldwide tour.

American alternative rock band The Lemonheads finally re-entered the Billboard charts in 2009 with Varshons; the band had not charted since 1996. That year, two more artists signed to the label; Juliette Lewis released Terra Incognita which was featured in multiple iTunes commercials, billboards and advertisements and The Charlatans released Who We Touch which stayed number one for three weeks at the Alt Specialty Radio charts.

Diversity (2010–2012)
In 2010 multi-platinum-selling artist Danzig entered the Top 40 charts with Deth Red Sabaoth, his highest charting album since Danzig III. Mercury prize winner Badly Drawn Boy signed to The End and released Part 1 of It's What I'm Thinking series. Canadian metallers Anvil also signed to the label that year, becoming a global phenomenon after the release of their documentary Anvil! The Story of Anvil.
With the drastic changes in the music industry, Andreas decided to adapt the label by signing indie electronic artists like Audio Bullys and Does It Offend You Yeah? along with electro-dub artists The Orb and The Prodigy. They launched The End Records Sampler which went number one on the Amazon charts. 2011 also marked the acquisition of the entire Music For Nations catalog including releases from Opeth, Paradise Lost, Cradle Of Filth, Anathema, Godflesh and more. 2012 brought an especially unique project: the iconic Halo 4 Original Soundtrack. Working with Microsoft, 7 Hz Productions and Neil Davidge proved to be a monumental move for the label and the release, cracking the record for Billboard's Highest Charting Video Game Soundtrack ever.
Always scouting for new talent, the label began working with UK management company Raw Power and released albums for AxeWound (Bullet For My Valentine, Cancer Bats), Funeral For A Friend, Crossfaith and While She Sleeps. The latter two performed all dates on the highly successful Warped Tour 2013.
The End Records rounded out 2012 with Rhythms Del Mundo ‘Africa’, which went number 1 at the iTunes world charts and became the main theme in Wold Bank's annual event.

Current (2013–present)
2013 brought more success; Helloween entered the US Top 100 charts for the first time in their career and The End's roster also grew with Petula Clark and Fatboy Slim.
Later in the year, The End released new albums from The Mission, Sponge, Hey! Hello! (Ginger Wildheart and Victoria Liedtke), Arthur Channel (Jack Irons, Greg Richling, Alain Johannes, Jon Greene), American Sharks, The Red Paintings, Crossfaith, Okta Logue, The Candles, Eklipse, Dead Letter Circus and many more.

The End's new world wide distribution deal with ADA (Alternative Distribution Alliance) came into effect in 2014 and the label announced some major signers: Nina Persson (The Cardigans, A Camp), Rich Robinson (The Black Crowes) and Neil Davidge (producer of Massive Attack and composer of Halo 4 OST) all signed on for their new solo albums.

The End also became more than just a label in 2014, expanding their business model to become a sub-distributor to smaller indie labels including 7 Hz, Crash Collide Records, Evilive Records, Imagen Records, Music For Nations, Small Stone Records, Svart Records, The Middle Ground, Unruly Sounds, Warner Music UK, Universal Scandinavia and Wanz0matic Records.

In June 2016, The End was acquired by BMG Rights Management.

Select artists

 American Sharks
 Amoral
 Anathema
 Anvil
 Arthur Channel
 Art Brut
 AxeWound
 Bad Powers
 Badly Drawn Boy
 Band of Merrymakers
 Ben Ottewell
 Better Than Ezra
 Bereft
 Billy Talent
 British Electric Foundation
 Cauldron
 Chantal Claret
 Charm City Devils
 Crossfaith
 The Candles
 Danzig
 Dead Letter Circus 
 Dir En Grey
 Eklipse
 Everclear
 Fatboy Slim
 FEAR
 Funeral for a Friend
 Hatchet
 Heliotropes
 Hey! Hello!
 HIM
 Hinder
 Kid Savant
 HUNG
 James Iha
 Krokus
 Lordi
 LostAlone
 Mekon
 Michelle Chamuel
 Mindless Self Indulgence
 The Mission
 Neil Davidge
 Nina Persson
 Rich Robinson
 Tarja Turunen
 The Dandy Warhols
 The Lemonheads
 The Prodigy
 The Red Paintings
 The Zombies
 Tournament
 Wakey Wakey
 While She Sleeps

Select discography

 Band of Merrymakers Must Be Christmas (November 17, 2014)
 Ben Ottewell Rattlebag (October 27, 2014)
 Better Than Ezra All Together Now (September 9, 2014)
 Brigitte A bouche que veux-tu (September 18, 2015)
 Michelle Chamuel Face the Fire (February 10, 2015)
 Charm City Devils Battles (September 23, 2014)
 The Dandy Warhols Thirteen Tales from Urban Bohemia Live at The Wonder (March 25, 2014)
 Neil Davidge Monsters: Dark Continent (April 14. 2015)
 Neil Davidge Slo Light (February 25, 2014)
 Dead Letter Circus Aesthesis (August 14, 2015)
 Dead Letter Circus The Catalyst Fire (October 29, 2013)
 Everclear Black Is the New Black (April 28, 2015)
 Gotthard Bang! (July 1, 2014)
 Hatchet Fear Beyond Lunacy (October 30, 2015)
 HIM Deep Shadows (Deluxe Re-Mastered) (December 15, 2014)
 HIM Greatest Lovesongs (Deluxe Re-Mastered) (December 15, 2014)
 HIM Love Metal (Deluxe Re-Mastered) (December 15, 2014)
 HIM Razorblade Romance (Deluxe Re-Mastered) (December 15, 2014)
 Hinder When the Smoke Clears (May 12, 2015)
 Imam Baildi III (June 16, 2015)
 Krokus Long Stick Goes Boom: Live from Da House of Rust (April 22, 2014)
 Nabiha Mind the Gap (September 23, 2014)
 Nina Persson Animal Heart (February 11, 2014)
 Nocturnal Poisoning Doomgrass (October 7, 2014)
 Novembers Doom Bled White (July 15, 2014)
 Rich Robinson Dirigible Utopia (December 9, 2014)
 Rich Robinson The Ceaseless Sight (June 3, 2014)
 Billy Talent Hits (November 24, 2014)
 Wakey Wakey Homeless Poets EP (September 25, 2015)
 The Zombies Still Got That Hunger (October 9, 2015)
 Aloke Alive (July 17, 2015)
 The Red Paintings 'The Revolution Is Never Coming' (October 1, 2013)
 Okta Logue 'Tales of Transit City' (October 1, 2013)
 American Sharks 'American Sharks' (September 17, 2013)
 Sponge 'Stop The Bleeding' (September 17, 2013)
 The Mission 'The Brightest Light Comes From The Darkest Place' (September 17, 2013)
 Crossfaith 'Apocalyze' (September 3, 2013)
 Eklipse 'Electric Air' (September 3, 2013)
 Hey! Hello! 'S/T' (July 23, 2013)
 The Candles 'La Candelaria' (July 9, 2013)
 Mekon 'Piece of Work' (July 9, 2013)
 Spirits of the Dead 'Rumours of a Presence' (June 25, 2013)
 Eklipse 'A Night In Strings' (June 25, 2013)
 Scott Lucas & The Married Men 'The Cruel Summer EP' (June 25, 2013)
 British Electric Foundation 'Music For Quality & Distinction, Volume 3: Dark' (June 11, 2013)
 The Orb (Feat. Lee Scratch Perry) 'More Tales From The Observatory' (June 11, 2013)
 Anvil 'Hope In Hell' (May 28, 2013)
 Pushmen 'The Sun Will Rise Soon On The False And The Fair' (April 30, 2013)
 Sacred Mother Tongue 'Out Of The Darkness' (April 30, 2013)
 While She Sleeps 'This Is The Six (Digital Deluxe)' (April 23, 2013)
 The Red Paintings 'You're Not One Of Them EP' (April 16, 2013)
 Art Brut 'Top Of The Pops' (April 16, 2013)
 LostAlone 'I'm A UFO In This City' (April 2, 2013)
 Petula Clark 'Lost In You' (April 2, 2013)
 Lordi 'To Beast Or Not To Beast' (March 19, 2013)
 Reverend And The Makers '@Reverend_Makers' (March 5, 2013)
 Hatchet 'Dawn Of The End' (March 5, 2013)
 Krokus 'Dirty Dynamite' (March 5, 2013)
 Godflesh 'Hymns: Special Edition' (February 19, 2013)
 Fatboy Slim 'Big Beach Boutique 5' (February 19, 2013)
 Funeral For A Friend 'Conduit' (February 5, 2013)
 Helloween 'Straight Out Of Hell' (January 22, 2013)

References

External links
 

American independent record labels
Record labels established in 1998
Rock record labels
Heavy metal record labels
Black metal record labels